Alexandra Maria Micu is a Romanian fashion model. She is known for her work both on the runway and in fashion magazines.

Career 
Micu was initially discovered at age 12, but decided to wait until she was more grown up. Three years later, in 2014, she participated in the Elite Model Look contest in Romania, and she became a top 10 finalist in the global version of the competition. Micu was then signed by modeling agencies.

She debuted as a Louis Vuitton exclusive for two seasons: F/W 2016 and S/S/2017, opening her first season's show. She appeared in Louis Vuitton's campaign starring actors Jaden Smith, Riley Keough, Sophie Turner, and Catherine Deneuve, as well as an ensemble of models including HoYeon Jung, Natalie Westling, and Sora Choi.

In 2018, Micu was ranked on models.com's "Hot List".

In addition to Louis Vuitton, she has walked for Balmain, Burberry, Chanel, Chloé, Dior, Dolce & Gabbana, Fendi, Salvatore Ferragamo, Hermès, Tommy Hilfiger, Max Mara, Stella McCartney, Mugler, Prada, Oscar de la Renta, Jil Sander, Proenza Schouler, Valentino, Alexandre Vauthier, and Versace.

Micu has appeared on many international magazine covers, including The Edit (now Porter magazine),  Harper's Bazaar (Germany, Romania, Spain), Numéro (French 200th cover with model Lexi Boling), Vogue (Taiwan, Turkey), and Wonderland.

References

External links

Alexandra Micu at Fashion Model Directory
Alexandra Micu at Models.com

Living people
Romanian female models
People from Transylvania
Year of birth missing (living people)
Ford Models models
Louis Vuitton exclusive models